Gloria Helena Corbellini Troche (born 7 January 1959) is a Uruguayan writer and professor.

Biography
Helena Corbellini was born in Montevideo in 1959 and has lived in Colonia del Sacramento since 2001.

She was a secondary school teacher and teaches classes at the Regional Center for Teachers in Colonia. She has worked in the 's Department of Culture, in workshops organized by the Ministry of Education and Culture, in the Council of Education Training, and the Uruguay Study Program.

As a cultural journalist, Corbellini has contributed to Zeta, Brecha, El País Cultural, and La República. In Maldonado she directed the magazine Asterisco. She is the author of poetry, novels, and texts aimed at students. Her stories have been published in anthologies of the genre.

Her novels include La vida brava. Los amores de Horacio Quiroga (2007), on the life of Horacio Quiroga, El sublevado. Garibaldi, corsario del Río de La Plata (2009), on the voyage of Giuseppe Garibaldi to Montevideo seen from the perspective of a female character, and Hay una cierva menos en el monte (2012), inspired by the 2004 homicide of a woman by her ex-husband in Conchillas, Colonia Department.

Works

Poetry
 Manuscrito hallado al este del Edén (Ed. Mirador, 1992)
 Círculo de sangre (Civiles iletrados, 2002)

Novels
 Laura Sparsi (Cal y Canto, 1995)
 La novia secreta del Corto Maltés (Fin de Siglo, 2000)
 La vida brava. Los amores de Horacio Quiroga (Sudamericana, 2007)
 El Sublevado. Garibaldi en el Río de la Plata (Sudamericana, 2009)
 Mi corazón pesa demasiado (illustrations by Fernando Cabezudo, 2008)
 Hay una cierva menos en el monte (Sudamericana, 2012)

Other works
 Roberto Arlt. La isla desierta (Ed. Técnica, 1991)
 Eugene O'Neill (Ed. Técnica, 1992)
 "Ida Vitale", in Historia de la Literatura Uruguaya Contemporánea, tomo II (Banda Oriental, 1997)
 Ilustrados y valientes (ANEP, 2014)

References

External links
 Ilustrados y valientes at ANEP 

1959 births
20th-century Uruguayan educators
20th-century journalists
20th-century novelists
20th-century Uruguayan poets
21st-century Uruguayan educators
21st-century journalists
21st-century novelists
21st-century Uruguayan poets
Living people
Uruguayan educators
Uruguayan journalists
Uruguayan women journalists
Uruguayan novelists
Uruguayan women educators
Uruguayan women novelists
Uruguayan women poets
Writers from Montevideo
21st-century Uruguayan women writers
20th-century Uruguayan women writers